Olivier Van Hoofstadt is a Belgian screenwriter and film director.

Filmography

References

External links

Living people
Belgian screenwriters
Year of birth missing (living people)
French-language film directors